Banian or Baneyan or Baniyan in Iran may refer to:

 Banian, Bushehr (بنيان - Banīān)
 Banian, Fars (بانيان - Bānīān)